Benjamin "Benno" Fürmann (born 17 January 1972) is a German film and television actor.  He is known for his lead role in the 2008 film The North Face, where he plays Toni Kurz based on the 1936 Eiger climbing disaster in Switzerland, the lead actor in Christian Petzold's Jerichow, Agnieszka Holland's In Darkness, and as the voice actor for Puss in Boots of the Shrek franchise in the German Dub.

Life and work
Fürmann was born in Berlin-Kreuzberg. By the age of 15 he had lost both his parents. At 17, he had a serious accident while train surfing, and had to spend six weeks in the hospital as a result. Fürmann left school after his Mittlere Reife and after that worked as a waiter and a bouncer. In 1991 he went to New York City and studied acting at the Lee Strasberg Theatre Institute.
Fürmann has a daughter and lives in Berlin, in the neighborhood of Prenzlauer Berg.

Awards 
1999 German Television Award Best Actor in a Leading Role for 
2000 Bavarian Film Awards, Best Actor

Filmography

1992: Die ungewisse Lage des Paradieses
1993:  (TV Movie) (with Beate Abraham, Muriel Baumeister) - Little Joe
1993:  - Schüler
1995: California Convertible
1998:  (TV Movie) (with Götz George, Nicolette Krebitz) - Gustav 'Bubi' Scholz - jung
1998: Kiss My Blood - John
1998: Candy - Robert
1998: The Polar Bear (with Til Schweiger, Karina Krawczyk) - Fabian
1999: Annaluise & Anton - Carlos
1999:  - Johnny
1999: Ne günstige Gelegenheit - Gosbert Klee
2000: Anatomy (with Franka Potente) - Hein
2000: Trust Me (with Christiane Paul) - Nils
2000:  - Der Neue
2000: The Princess and the Warrior (with Franka Potente, Joachim Król) - Bodo
2001: Jeans
2001: High Score (TV Movie) - Lars Schelling
2002: Naked (with Heike Makatsch, Jürgen Vogel, Alexandra Maria Lara) - Felix
2002: Wolfsburg (with Nina Hoss) - Philipp Gerber
2003: My House in Umbria (TV Movie) (with Maggie Smith) - Werner
2003: The Order (alternative title: The Sin Eater) (with Heath Ledger) - William Eden
2004: Shrek 2 - Puss in Boots (German Dub)
2004: Dark Kingdom: The Dragon King (TV Movie) (with Alicia Witt) - Eric / Siegfried
2005: Ghosts (with Julia Hummer) - Oliver
2005: Joyeux Noël (with Diane Kruger and Daniel Brühl) - Nikolaus Sprink
2006: Die Wilden Hühner - Lehrer Grünbaum
2006:  (TV Movie) - Jürgen Urban
2006: Crusade in Jeans - Thaddeus
2007: Die Wilden Hühner und die Liebe - Lehrer Grünbaum
2007: Shrek the Third - Puss in Boots (German Dub)
2007: Pornorama (with Tom Schilling) - Freddie
2007: Survivre avec les loups - Reuven
2007: Why Men Don't Listen and Women Can't Read Maps - Jan Rietmüller
2008: Speed Racer (with Emile Hirsch and John Goodman) - Inspector Detector
2008: Mutant Chronicles - Lt. Maximillian von Steiner
2008: North Face (with Johanna Wokalek and Ulrich Tukur) - Toni Kurz
2008: Jerichow - Thomas
2009: Die Wilden Hühner und das Leben - Lehrer Grünbaum
2009: Germany 09 - Herr Feierlich (segment "Feierlich reist")
2009:  (with Alexandra Maria Lara) - Marc Barenberg
2009: Mullewapp - Johnny Mauser (voice)
2009: Farewell - Agent fédéral allemand 1
2009: Überlebensstrategien für das neue Jahrtausend - Werner Krupp
2009:  - Jo Schwertlein
2010: Teufelskicker - Moritz' Vater
2010: Shrek Forever After - Puss in Boots (German Dub)
2010:  - Rolf Haas
2011: In Darkness - Mundek Margulies
2011: Puss in Boots - Puss in Boots (German Dub)
2011:  - Injun Joe
2012: Lara
2013:  - Der reiche Mann von Friedrichshagen
2013:  - Ulrich Chaussy
2013: Der fast perfekte Mann - Ulf
2014: Quatsch und die Nasenbärbande - Tierpfleger
2014: Die Einsamkeit des Killers vor dem Schuss - Koralnik
2014: Nachthelle - Bernd
2015: Von glücklichen Schafen - Klaus
2015: Survivor - Pavlou
2015:  - Sven Stanislawski
2015: Fiddlesticks - Animal Catcher
2016: Volt - Volt
2017: Fühlen Sie sich manchmal ausgebrannt und leer? - Leopold
2017-2022: Babylon Berlin (TV Series) - Oberst Wendt
2018: Intrigo: Death of an Author - David
2019: Get Lucky - Martin
2019: Hanna - Dieter
2022: Puss in Boots: The Last Wish - Puss in Boots (German Dub)

References

External links 

http://www.prisma-online.de/tv/person.html?pid=benno_fuermann

1972 births
Living people
German male film actors
German male television actors
20th-century German male actors
21st-century German male actors
Lee Strasberg Theatre and Film Institute alumni
Male actors from Berlin
People from Friedrichshain-Kreuzberg